The United Nations categorizes Bangladesh as a moderate democratic Muslim country. Sunni Islam is the largest and dominant religion practiced in the country.
In the Constitution of Bangladesh, Islam is referred to twice in the introduction and Part I of the constitution. The document begins with the Islamic phrase Basmala (بِسْمِ اللهِ الرَّحْمٰنِ الرَّحِيْمِ) which in English is translated as "In the name of Allah, the Beneficent, the Merciful" and article (2A) declares that :"Islam is the state religion of the republic". 

In Bangladesh, there are four major religions; Islam, Hinduism, Buddhism and Christianity. A few people also follow religions like Sikhism, Bahai Faith, Sarnaism, Animism and some other religions. Islam is the largest religion in all the districts of Bangladesh.

Prime Minister Sheikh Hasina has stated that Bangladesh will be governed in line with the spirit of the Constitution of Medina. But at the same time, the Constitution of Bangladesh calls secularism one of the four fundamental principles of the original Constitution of Bangladesh. Despite having Islam as the state religion, Bangladesh is mostly governed by secular laws, set up during the times when the country was ruled by the British Crown. 

The constitution also states that "the State shall ensure equal status and equal right in the practice of the Hindu, Buddhist, Christian and other faiths and religions".
"Freedom of religion" is its basic structure guaranteed by Bangladeshi constitution in which it calls for equal rights to all its citizens irrespective of their religious differences and it also bans discrimination on the grounds of religion in various platforms.

Bangladesh is one of the few secular Muslim-majority nations and "proselytizing" i.e. conversions from one religion to another are legally accepted and is legalized by law under article 41 of the constitution, subject to law, public order and morality.

Population by religion

Islam

The Muslim population in Bangladesh was over 150.36 million in 2022, which makes up 91.04 per cent percent of the population in the country. Estimation shows that over 1 million Rohingya Muslim refugees live in Bangladesh who have come here during the period of (2016–17) massacre in Myanmar. On 28 September 2018, at the 73rd United Nations General Assembly, Bangladeshi Prime Minister Sheikh Hasina said there are 1.1-1.3 million Rohingya refugees now in Bangladesh. The Constitution of Bangladesh declares Islam as the state religion. Bangladesh is the fourth-largest Muslim-populated country. Muslims are the predominant community of the country and they form the majority of the population in all eight divisions of Bangladesh. The overwhelming majority of Bangladeshi Muslims are Bengali Muslims at 88 per cent, but a small segment about 2 per cent of them are Bihari Muslims. Most Muslims in Bangladesh are Sunnis, but there is a small Shia community. Most of those who are Shia reside in urban areas. Although these Shias are few in number, Shia observance commemorating the martyrdom of Muhammad's grandson, Husain ibn Ali, is widely observed by the nation's Sunnis. Muslims celebrate Eid ul-Fitr, Eid ul-Adha, Muharram, Milad un Nabi, Shab-e-Barat and Chand Raat all across the country with much fanfare and grandeur. The annual Bishwa Ijtema is the largest and most notable congregation of Muslims in Bangladesh.

The Muslim community in the Bengal region i.e., Bangladesh and West Bengal, developed independently of the dominant Islamic trends in India. Features of Bangladeshi Hinduism, which differed in some respects from Hinduism in other parts of South Asia, influenced both the practices and the social structure of the Bangladeshi Muslim community. In spite of the general personal commitment to Islam by the Muslims of Bangladesh, observance of Islamic rituals and tenets varies according to social position, locale, and personal considerations. In rural regions, some beliefs and practices tend to incorporate elements that differ from and often conflict with orthodox Islam. According to Aziz Ahmad, Arabic Islamic scholars have considered the form of Islam followed in Bengal i.e. (Bangladesh, West Bengal) to have some elements of Crypto-Hinduism in it.

Hinduism

Hinduism is the second largest religious affiliation in Bangladesh, with around 13.1 million people identifying themselves as Hindus out of 165.16 million people and making up about 7.95 per cent of the total population as second largest minority according to the recent 2022 census. In terms of population, Bangladesh is the third largest Hindu populated country of the world, just after India and Nepal.

Bangladeshi Hindus are predominantly Bengali Hindus, but a distinct Hindu population also exists among the indigenous tribes like Garo, Khasi, Jaintia, Santhal, Bishnupriya Manipuri, Tripuri, Munda, Oraon, Dhanuk etc.
Hindus are evenly distributed throughout all regions of Bangladesh, with significant concentrations in northern, southwestern and northeastern parts of the country. In nature, Bangladeshi Hinduism closely resembles the rituals and customs of Hinduism practised in the neighbouring Indian state of West Bengal, with which Bangladesh (at one time known as East Bengal) was united until the partition of India in 1947. Hindu festivals of Durga Puja, Rath Yatra and Janmashtami witness jubilant celebrations across various cities, towns and villages of Bangladesh.

Buddhism

About 1 million people in Bangladesh adhere to the Theravada school of Buddhism. Buddhists form about 0.63 per cent of the population of Bangladesh as per 2022 census.

In antiquity, the region of present-day Bangladesh was a center of Buddhism in Asia. Buddhist civilisation, including philosophies and architecture, traveled to Tibet, Southeast Asia and Indonesia from Bengal. The Buddhist architecture of Cambodia, Indonesia and Thailand, including the Angkor Wat Temple and the Borobudur vihara, are believed to have been inspired by the ancient monasteries of Bangladesh such as the Somapura Mahavihara. Strange though it may now seem in such an overwhelmingly Muslim country, Buddhism has been no small player in the nation's history and culture.

Most of the followers of Buddhism in Bangladesh live in the Chittagong division. Here, Buddhism is practised by the Bengali-speaking Baruas, who are almost exclusively Buddhist and are concentrated heavily in the Chittagong area as well as few of the Barua Buddhists live in other parts of Bangladesh, such as Comilla, Mymensingh, Rangpur, Sylhet districts. Most of the followers of Buddhism in Bangladesh live in southeastern region, especially in the Chittagong Hill Tracts, Chittagong and Comilla district. Most of the Buddhists of Chittagong Hill Tracts belong to the Chakma, Marma, Mru, Khumi, Bawm, Chak, Kuki, Murang, Tanchangya and Khiang tribes, who since time immemorial have practised Buddhism. Other tribal communities who practise animism, have come under some Buddhist influence. The beliefs and rituals of the Buddhist communities in this region are amalgamations of Buddhism and ancient animistic faiths. Buddha Purnima is the most widely observed festival among both Bengali Buddhists and Buddhist tribes.

Christianity

Christianity arrived in what is now Bangladesh during the late sixteenth to early seventeenth centuries AD, through the Portuguese traders and missionaries. Christians numbering around half a million account for approximately 0.29 per cent of the total population and they are mostly an urban community. Roman Catholicism is predominant among the Bengali Christians, while the remaining are mostly Baptist and others. Few followers of Christianity are also present among certain indigenous tribal communities such as Garo, Santal, Orao, Chakma, khasi, Lushei, Bawm, etc.

The Church of Jesus Christ of Latter-day Saints (LDS) also exists in Bangladesh.

Other religions

Bangladesh has a small community of the Baháʼí Faith. Baháʼís have spiritual centres in Dhaka, Chittagong, Khulna, Rajshahi, Sylhet, Barisal, Rangpur, Mymensingh, Jessore, Rangamati and other places.

Bangladesh also has a tiny Brahmo Samaj community.

The Jehovah's Witnesses also exist in Bangladesh.

Sikhism

There are approximately 23,000 people adhering to the religion of Sikhism. The presence of this religion goes back to the visitation of Guru Nanak in 1506–07 with some of his followers to spread Sikhism in the region of the present-day Bangladesh. When some Bengali people accepted this faith, a Sikh community was born. This community became bigger when almost 10,000 Sikhs came from India during the Bangladesh Liberation War. This community has made great progress in the country. Today there are almost 10 gurdwaras in Bangladesh. Among them only 7 are well-known, especially the Gurdwara Nanak Shahi beside the University of Dhaka in Dhaka, which was built in 1830, the oldest gurdwara in Bangladesh.

Secularism

Demographic landscape of Bangladesh before partition

East Bengal (present-day-Bangladesh) had a population of 39.12 million by the year (1941), of which 27.5 million people were followers of Islamic religion representing about (70.3%) of the region's population, while 10.95 million belongs to the Hindu faith constituting (28%) of the region. Smaller number of 6.65 lakhs people follows Buddhism, Animism and Christianity together presenting around (1.7%) of the region.

Demographic landscape of Bangladesh after Independence from Pakistan (1974)

After 1974, East Pakistan became sovereign nation of People republic of Bangladesh. During that time the population of Bangladesh was found to be 68.7 million, of which majority of 58.7 million people professed to Islamic Faith comprising 85.4% of the country's population, Hindus are second largest community with a population of 9.28 million comprising 13.5% of the country's population, while 1.1% practices other religions like Buddhism and Christianity.

Immigration & refugee crisis

Before the Partition of Bengal, it was found that the Muslim population of West Bengal stood at 26% and the Hindu population of East Bengal stood at 28% respectively. Soon after partition, Muslim population in West Bengal have reduced from 26% in 1941 to 19% in 1951, while Hindu population in East Bengal have reduced from 28% in 1941 to 22% in 1951.

During 1971 Bangladesh liberation war

It is estimated that during the time of Bangladesh liberation war, an estimated population of around 10 million people most being 80% Hindus fled from East Pakistan to neighbouring India as refugees following the torture of Pakistani army, and after independence nearly an estimated population of 1.5-2 million Hindus stayed back in India and never went back.

Aspects and practices of secularism
Bangladesh declared itself a secular state with its birth in 1971. Secularism was chosen as one of the four pillars that were to guide official policy of the nation. To certain extent Bangladeshi people were "secular". Secularism in Bangladesh means pluralism of religious faiths as opposed to more expansive definitions of the term. Tajuddin Ahmad, Provisional Prime Minister of Bangladesh (1971-72) have meet with a Buddhist delegation. According to a report in the Bangladesh Observer, the prime minister declared that Bangladesh would be a "completely secular state without state religion and would ensure absolute freedom to every religious beliefs and practices. He said that the state would never interfere in the matter of any religion but at the same time he said it would not allow anybody to exploit the people in the name of religion," like mixing of religion with politics which can be seen in theocratic state like Pakistan. On 12 October 1972, while participating in a discussion in parliament on the draft of the  constitution, Banagabandhu literally Sheikh Mujibur Rahman, the 1st Prime Minister of Bangladesh who was once a devout member of Muslim league has said: "We Bangladeshis believe in secularism. Secularism does not mean the absence of religion. Muslims, Hindus, Christians, Buddhists everyone will perform their own religion. No one can interfere with others’ religious beliefs. The people of Bangladesh do not want interference in religion." "He further said that Religion cannot be used for political reasons. Religion will not be allowed to be used in Bangladesh for political purposes. He believed that if anyone does it, the people of Bangladesh will retaliate against them,". But soon after his death, the original constitution was changed in 1978 with installment of the phrase "absolute trust and faith in the Almighty Allah" as 5th amendment of the constitution by Ziaur Rahman government in order to replace secularism as a state principle. The military dictator who followed Rehman, Hussain Muhammad Ershad, went one step further and declared Islam as the official religion in 1988. Bangabandhu's party, the Bangladesh Awami League, once again came to the power in January 2009 with the promise to restore the 1972 constitution. They partially did so through the 15th Amendment to the constitution in 2013 but they kept Islam as the state religion. In 2010, Bangladesh Supreme Court declared the 5th amendment illegal and restored secularism as one of the basic tenets of the Constitution though Islam remained the state religion in the constitution.

Main aspects of secular principles

Article 8 of part - (II) described  secularism as the fundamental principles of state policy.
The main principles of Secularism in the Bangladeshi constitution were described under article 12 of Part- (II) -

12. The principle of secularism shall be realised by the elimination of -

(a) Communalism in all its forms;

(b) The granting by the State of political status in favour of any religion;

(c) The abuse of religion for political purposes;

(d) Any discrimination against, or persecution of, persons practicing a particular religion.

Controversy

Islam is the state religion of Bangladesh by article 2A but this article came into direct conflict with the article 12 of part- (II) of 2nd stanza which states that "The state should not grant political status in favour of any religion" as secularism has been defined as one of the four fundamental principles of Bangladesh. Article (2A) of the constitution also state's that "the state shall ensure equal status and equal right in the practice of the Hindu, Buddhist, Christian and other religions" while giving a special status to Islam which have led to a huge controversy regarding the country's foundation.
The Supreme Court of Bangladesh on 28 March 2016 upheld the status of Islam as the State religion. The ruling was given by the High Court Division of the court while dismissing a petition which was almost about 28 years ago, filed by Samendra Nath Goswami challenging Islam as the religion of republic which directly contradicts with secular foundation of the nation. Petition was also held earlier by Professor Anisuzzaman, one of the leaders of the petitioning organisation who said that Bangladesh was founded as a secular state, and having a state religion contradicts the basic structure of the constitution,".
 On 14 November 2016 a senior ruling Awami League leader have said that Bangladesh will drop Islam as the country's state religion "when the time comes" and Islam has been kept as the state religion for strategic reasons," said the party's Presidium Member and former minister Abdur Razzaq. The Bangladesh Army have close ideological association with centre-right and conservative political parties led by the Bangladesh Nationalist Party, and the army have also stated that the term Bangladeshi nationalism refers to the country as an Islamic nation given that more than 91% of the population of their nation is Muslim. Every year, on 9 June, Bangladesh's Hindu, Buddhist and Christian religious unity leaders marked the day as "Black Day" together as because on this day of 1988 year, the country have been declared Islamic by General Hussain Muhammad Ershad. The Bangladesh Hindu Buddhist Christian Unity Council have also renewed its call several times for the 8th amendment Islam as state religion of republic to be scrapped from the constitution. Recently on 4 July 2021, there was a huge debate going on parliament that keeping secularism in the country's constitution is against Islam and Quran. Harunur Rashid, a Bangladeshi lawmaker of BNP party member told to Prime Minister Sheikh Hasina in the parliament "that there is no mention of secularism in the Quran and it conflicts Islam". Then Bangladesh Prime Minister Sheikh Hasina have replied him back by stating "secularism in the constitution of Bangladesh never conflicts Islam as in the Quran there is a mentioned of the word - ('La'kum Dinukum Waliyadin') which means everybody has the right to follow their own belief and religion and s/he will follow his religion. The BNP lawmaker have also said that keeping secularism in the constitution is conflicting for the Muslim majority country leading to once more time a heated controversy regarding the country's foundation. On 15 October 2021, Bangladesh's State Minister for Information Murad Hasan have said that Bangladesh will return to its 1972 constitution offered by Father of the Nation Bangabandhu Sheikh Mujibur Rahman. Murad said that Islam is not state religion and he does not believe in that. He have further said that "We'll return to the 1972 constitution. We'll get that bill passed in parliament under the leadership of the Prime Minister (Sheikh Hasina)," soon. He further said, Military dictators tried to undermine Bangladesh's core ideal of secularism by declaring Islam as the state religion and lashed out at the Bangladesh Nationalist Party lead Jamaat e islami for unleashing violence and creating divisions in the country in the name of religion. Bangladesh's Jatiya Party (JaPa) Chairman GM Quader on Monday criticized the State Minister for Information Dr Murad Hassan for his remarks on changing the status of Islam as the state religion of Bangladesh. GM Quader have said that "He violated the oath to preserve the constitution. As per as him the state minister should step down" as because the state minister wants to removed Islam from the official status by reverting the original 1972 secular constitution of Bangladesh. He further alleged that the state minister also committed a nefarious act by making derogatory remarks against JaPa founder HM Ershad and the Army. The party leader urged the prime minister to take action against the junior minister and expel him from Awami League. In 2022 November, Bangladesh Law Minister Anisul Huq have announced that Bangladesh’s Ruling party Awami League is planning to restore country’s Original 1972 Secular Constitution, and will soon repeal the Amendment that made It an ‘Islamic’ Nation by scrapping Article 2A and further said that It will be done when the right time comes. On 8th January, 2023 Bangladesh Hindu-Buddhist-Christian Oikya Parishad have submitted a memorandum to Prime Minister Sheikh Hasina, demanding that the ruling Awami League have misused the minority vote and betrayed them severely. The submission of memorandum came after the parishad ended its road march to Capital city from Chittagong. The parishad also staged a protest rally in front of the Dhaka's Ramna Kali Mandir and at that time, Parishad's general secretary Mr. Rana Dasgupta have read out the memorandum saying that, "They have seen from their naked eyes that how the 1972's Secular constitution have got transformed into a communal one and how the state religion Islam (Article 2A) got incorporated in the constitution in the year of 1988 by Military dictatorial President Hussain Muhammad Ershad. He further concluded that "It's not only have divided the people on the basis of religion, but also turned the religious-ethnic minorities of the country into 2nd class citizens. Many religious minority groups have been forced to emigrate due to years of deprivation, discrimination, persecution and oppression by the Islamic state." Later On, the parishad have demanded a ministry formation for the cause of welfare and social upliftment of minority communities. On 1st March 2023, Professor Syed Anwar Hossain of History Department of Dhaka University have called the students and youth community of the nation to build up a resistance against the compromise of the government and have said that keeping Islam as state religion in the constitution, the nation could not be secular state in true sense and as a result present ruling Awami League government is compromising with the communal Islamist forces to remain in power. He further said that the state had deviated from its core ideal principles of Secularism as "Bangladesh was founded on the basis of Bengali nationalism and not on the basis of Muslim nationalism". Various writers and journalists like Shahriar Kabir have said that they had warned the Awami League government for making such a compromise with the Islamic forces.

Law, religion, and religious freedom

Although Bangladesh initially opted for a secular nationalist ideology as embodied in its Constitution, the principle of secularism was subsequently replaced by a commitment to the Islamic way of life through a series of constitutional amendments and government proclamations between 1977 and 1988. During the eighties, the state was designated exclusively Islamic. However, in 2010, the secularism of the 1972 Constitution was reaffirmed. The Government generally respects this provision in practice; however, some members of the Hindu, Christian, Buddhist, and Ahmadiyya communities experience discrimination. The Government (2001-2006), led by an alliance of four parties (Bangladesh Nationalist Party, Bangladesh Jamaat-e-Islami, Islami Oikya Jote and Bangladesh Jatiyo Party) banned the Ahmadiyya literature by an executive order.

Family laws concerning marriage, divorce, and adoption differ depending on the religion of the person involved. There are no legal restrictions on marriage between members of different faiths.

In 2010, secularism was restored, but Islam remains the nominal state religion per Article 12.

Atheism

A survey, commissioned by WIN-Gallup International, conducted from 5 November 2014, to 25 November 2014, found that fewer than one per cent of Bangladeshi's said they were "convinced Atheists". 

In Bangladesh several people especially bloggers, secularists, liberals, non-religious, Non-Muslims  have been brutally killed by Islamic militants for mocking and questioning Islam. Jihadist Islamic militants in the nation are seen as a key challenge by the Bangladeshi authorities. The Islamist terrorism was imported into Bangladesh in the early 1990s by the jihadist returnees of the Soviet–Afghan War, who wanted to turn Bangladesh into a full-fledged Islamic state ruled by the Islamic law or Sharia law with 100 percent Muslim population.

Further reading
Benkin, Richard L. (2014). A quiet case of ethnic cleansing: The murder of Bangladesh's Hindus. New Delhi: Akshaya Prakashan.
Dastidar, S. G. (2008). Empire's last casualty: Indian subcontinent's vanishing Hindu and other minorities. Kolkata: Firma KLM.
Kamra, A. J. (2000). The prolonged partition and its pogroms: Testimonies on violence against Hindus in East Bengal 1946–64.
Taslima Nasrin (2014). Lajja. Gurgaon, Haryana, India : Penguin Books India Pvt. Ltd, 2014.
Rosser, Yvette Claire. (2004) Indoctrinating Minds: Politics of Education in Bangladesh, New Delhi: Rupa & Co. .
Mukherji, S. (2000). Subjects, citizens, and refugees: Tragedy in the Chittagong Hill Tracts, 1947–1998. New Delhi: Indian Centre for the Study of Forced Migration.
Sarkar, Bidyut (1993). Bangladesh 1992: This is our home: Sample Document of the Plight of our Hindu, Buddhist, Christian and Tribal Minorities in our Islamized Homeland: Pogroms 1987–1992. Bangladesh Minority Hindu, Buddhist, Christian, (and Tribal) Unity Council of North America.

See also
 1991 Bangladesh census
 2001 Bangladesh census
 2011 Bangladesh census

References

 
Religious demographics